Kolej MARA Banting (abbreviated KMB or MCB; formerly known as MRSM Banting)

History
MCB is an International Baccalaureate World School since October 1990.

Its history began in 1985 when the GCE A-Level programme was introduced in MARA Junior Science College Seremban (MRSM Seremban, now known as Kolej MARA Seremban). To diversify the number of universities that students can apply to, in 1991 the college introduced a new pre-university programme: the IB Diploma Programme. (The IB programme is recognised for admission into universities around the world.)

To accommodate the growing programmes and students, a new 84-acre campus in Banting was constructed. On 1 July 1992, the new campus started operations under the name MRSM Banting with a 71 International Baccalaureate students from MRSM Cheras and 310 GCE A-Level students from MRSM Cheras and MRSM Seremban.

In 1994, the name of the junior college was changed to Kolej MARA Banting (MARA College Banting) to differentiate the college from the other MARA Junior Science Colleges and appropriately reflect the pre-university student body. The IB diploma depicts the name MARA College Banting in the transcript. The college has 94 lecturers with 41 support staff running day-to-day activities. Since May 2003, MARA College Banting has become a full-fledged 'IB World School'. Previously, MARA College Banting offered other pre-university programmes such as GCE A-Level and Matriculation but now only the IB

Campus
The college campus is in the town of Bukit Changgang, Banting. Nearby points of interest include Kuala Lumpur International Airport, Putrajaya, and Cyberjaya.

Academics
Students sit for their IB examination in May. Among the subjects offered are Biology HL, Business and Management SL and HL, Chemistry HL, Economics SL and HL, English A2, B SL and HL, Information Technology in Global Society SL, Malay A1 SL, Mathematics SL and HL, Physics HL, and Theory of Knowledge.

Students may request other subjects and, because of this, Malay A1 HL, and Physics SL have been introduced.

Although intake is open to the public (to date only a few alumni are private paying students), students usually gain entry by winning a scholarship.

To date, the organisations that offer such scholarships are Majlis Amanah Rakyat (MARA), Yayasan Tenaga Nasional (YTN) and JPA-MARA.

The college serves as a preparation center for students to study at top universities especially abroad due to its international focus. Many of the students will pursue their first degree majoring in Accountancy, Engineering, Medicine, Biotechnology, Applied science, Biomedicine, Architecture, Economy, or Dentistry. Previously, disciplines such as Business Studies, Geology, Computer Science and Estate Management were also offered to students.

University placements for the IB graduates have been in the United Kingdom, Ireland, Australia, New Zealand, Czech Republic, Canada, United States of America, India and local universities.

Mega Fair
After a two-year break, the Mega Fair entrepreneur program was held on 3 and 4 March 2017. This event is a way to teach and gain experience on how to become a smart entrepreneur. Students need to handle the activities and learn how to attract vendors.

The day before the event, students were given a chance to learn how to deal and interact in a professional way with vendors (merchandises and food trucks) and, at the same time, get commissions from them. Students were guided by their teachers.

Many activities and events were held during the Mega Fair. The college invited Heliza Helmi, PU Rahmat and Harith Othman to give a talk about business; the slot was called "Sembang Santai". Activities included a clown show, Kids Fashion Show, FootBall Match, Haunted House, Laser Tag, Zorbing and more.

Gallery

References

External links
 

Educational institutions established in 1991
1991 establishments in Malaysia
International Baccalaureate schools in Malaysia
Universities and colleges in Selangor